GVL may refer to:
 gamma-Valerolactone
 Grand Valley Lanthorn, the student newspaper of Grand Valley State University
 Gesellschaft zur Verwertung von Leistungsschutzrechten, a German copyright collection society 
 Gudlavalleru railway station, in Andhra Pradesh, India
 Gulay language
 Lee Gilmer Memorial Airport, in Gainesville, Georgia, United States
 Greenville, South Carolina